John Graham Miller (8 October 1913 – 6 September 2008) was a New Zealand-Australian pastor and missionary.

Miller was born in Rangiora, New Zealand and studied at the University of Otago and Knox College, Otago. He served as a missionary in the New Hebrides (now Vanuatu), working on the island of Tangoa, where he was principal of the Tangoa Training Institute from 1947 to 1952. Miller was elected the inaugural Moderator of the General Assembly of the Presbyterian Church in Vanuatu in 1948. He later pastored churches in New Zealand and Australia, and served as Principal of the Melbourne Bible Institute, before returning to Tangoa to help establish the Presbyterian Bible College there in 1971.

In 1980, a Festschrift was published in his honour: Evangelism and the Reformed faith: and other essays commemorating the ministry of J. Graham Miller.

Publications
Jonah - A Sign, J. Graham Miller, Gospel Literature Service, Bombay, 1961.
A Workbook on Christian Doctrine, J. Graham Miller, Lawson, NSW, Australia 1974.
A History of Church Planting in the New Hebrides, J. Graham Miller, Book 1 1978, Book 2 1981, Book 3 1985, Book 4 1986, Book 5 1987, Book 6 1989, Book 7 1990, Sydney, Australia.
The Treasury of His Promises, J. Graham Miller, The Banner of Truth Trust, Edinburgh 1986, reprinted 2001.
Calvin’s Wisdom: An Anthology, J. Graham Miller, The Banner of Truth Trust, Edinburgh 1992.
An A-Z of Christian Truth and Experience, J. Graham Miller, The Banner of Truth Trust, Edinburgh 2003.
A Day’s March Nearer Home: Autobiography of J. Graham Miller, edited by Iain H. Murray, The Banner of Truth Trust 2010.

References

1913 births
2008 deaths
New Zealand emigrants to Australia
People from Rangiora
University of Otago alumni
New Zealand Presbyterian missionaries
Presbyterian missionaries in Vanuatu
Seminary presidents
New Zealand expatriates in Vanuatu